The 1995 Australian Individual Speedway Championship was held at the Gosford Speedway in Gosford, New South Wales on 27 January 1995.

Jason Crump won his first Australian Championship, joining his father Phil Crump to be the only father/son combination to win the Australian Championship. 1991 champion Craig Boyce finished second following a runoff with triple defending champion Leigh Adams after both finished on 13 points. Jason Lyons finished in fourth place while dual South Australian Champion Shane Parker defeated Stephen Davies in a runoff to claim the final available place in the Overseas Final.

1995 Australian Solo Championship
 Australian Championship
 27 January 1995
  Gosford, New South Wales - Gosford Speedway
 Referee: 
 Qualification: The top five riders go through to the Overseas Final in Coventry, England.

References

See also
 Australia national speedway team
 Sport in Australia

Speedway in Australia
Australia
Individual Speedway Championship